General Pratt may refer to:

Don Pratt (1892–1944), U.S. Army brigadier general
Douglas Henry Pratt (1892–1958), British Army major general
Henry Conger Pratt (1882–1966), U.S. Army major general
James T. Pratt (1802–1887), Connecticut Horse Guard major general
Richard Henry Pratt (1840–1924), U.S. Army brigadier general
Thomas Simson Pratt (1797–1879), British Army general

See also
John Pratt (soldier) (1753–1824), U.S. Army captain who served as acting Adjutant General of the U.S. Army
Attorney General Pratt (disambiguation)